The 2022 Phillips 66 International Team Trials was held from April 26 to 30, 2022 in Greensboro, North Carolina at the Greensboro Aquatic Center. Contested swimming events were conducted in a 50-meter (long course) pool. The competition served as the selection meet for determining the swim team to represent the United States at the 2022 World Aquatics Championships, 2022 Junior Pan Pacific Swimming Championships, and 2022 Mel Zajac Junior International. It was held separate from the 2022 US National Championships.

Host selection
In August 2021, Greensboro Aquatic Center in Greensboro, North Carolina was announced as host of the International Team Trials in part due to scheduling conflicts in Indianapolis, Indiana with the 2022 FDIC International, which had already been scheduled and resulted in hotels being booked during the date range of interest.

Overall results
All events were swum in a heats, finals format except for the 800 meter and 1500 meter freestyle events which were broken into slowest heats and a timed final where competitors swam the event once. Event finals were broken into a, b, and c finals with a and b finals open to anyone and the c final reserved for junior swimmers.

Key:

Men

Women

 Annie Lazor, was selected for the 2022 World Aquatics Championships team in the 50 meter breaststroke based on her second-place finish in an Olympic event, the 100 meter breaststroke, and swimming a FINA "A" cut time, 31.04 seconds, in the first 50 meters of the 100 meter breaststroke event, instead of being selected based on results from the 50 meter breaststroke event, which she chose not to compete in at the Trials.

Results for World Championships freestyle relay events
The following swimmers fulfilled the qualification criteria and were named to the team roster for the 2022 World Aquatics Championships in the event.

Men

Women

Records set
The following records were set during the course of competition.

International team qualifiers

2022 World Aquatics Championships team
The following pool swimmers qualified for the United States team in at least one event for the 2022 World Aquatics Championships, held in Budapest, Hungary in June and July. Pool swimmers who qualified for the World Championships took part in an out-of-country training camp, in Rijeka, Croatia in early to mid-June, training all-together prior to the start of competition. USA Swimming previously used Croatia as a pre-competition training camp base leading up to the 2015 World Aquatics Championships, in Kazan, Russia, and the 2017 World Aquatics Championships, also in Budapest, Hungary.

Men
 Michael Andrew, Hunter Armstrong, Coby Carrozza, Shaine Casas, Charlie Clark, Brooks Curry, Caeleb Dressel, Nic Fink, Bobby Finke, Carson Foster, Trey Freeman, Ryan Held, Trenton Julian, Chase Kalisz, Drew Kibler, Ryan Murphy, Justin Ress, Kieran Smith, Charlie Swanson, Luca Urlando.

Women
 Phoebe Bacon, Katharine Berkoff, Erika Brown, Mallory Comerford, Claire Curzan, Kate Douglass, Hali Flickinger, Katie Grimes, Leah Hayes, Natalie Hinds, Torri Huske, Lilly King, Annie Lazor, Katie Ledecky, Bella Sims, Leah Smith, Regan Smith, Alex Walsh, Claire Weinstein, Emma Weyant, Rhyan White.

2022 Junior Pan Pacific Swimming Championships team
The following pool swimmers achieved a spot on the United States roster in at least one event for the 2022 Junior Pan Pacific Swimming Championships.

Men
 Spencer Aurnou-Rhees, Ben Delmar, Daniel Diehl, Diggory Dillingham, Bobby Dinunzio, Alec Enyeart, Zhier Fan, Thomas Heilman, Keaton Jones, Ilya Kharun (roster version one only), Cooper Lucas, Matthew Lucky, Rex Maurer, Henry McFadden, Watson Nguyen, Josh Parent, Aaron Shackell, Hudson Williams, Maximus Williamson, Kaii Winkler, Josh Zuchowski.

Women
 Berit Berglund, Lily Christianson, Jillian Cox, Piper Enge, Erin Gemmell, Cavan Gormsen, Kayla Han, Bailey Hartman, Tess Howley, Natalie Mannion, Michaela Mattes, Anna Moesch, Kennedy Noble, Teagan O'Dell, Julia Podkościelny, Alex Shackell, Emily Thompson, Maggie Wanezek, Gracie Weyant, Kayla Wilson.

2022 Mel Zajac Junior International team
The following pool swimmers were each named to the roster for the 2022 Mel Zajac Junior International team representing the United States in at least one event.

Men
 Matthew Chai, JT Ewing, Nate Germonprez, Braeden Haughey, Mitchell Ledford, Will Modglin, Humberto Najera, Baylor Nelson, Jacob Pishko.

Women
 Lucy Bell, Hannah Bellard, Lilla Bognar, Chloe Kim, Erika Pelaez, Addison Sauickie, Levenia Sim, Blair Stoneburg, Maddie Waggoner, Ella Welch.

See also
 United States at the 2022 World Aquatics Championships
 Swimming at the 2022 World Aquatics Championships
 List of swimming competitions

References

External links
 Results
 Results book

Swimming competitions in the United States
2022 in swimming
USA Swimming International Team Trials
2022 in sports in North Carolina